Dawood Ali Shambih Jassem Al-Bloushi (Arabic: داود علي شامبيه جاسم البلوشي; born 29 December 1983) is an Emirati international footballer who plays for Hatta as a right back or winger.

International career

International goals
Scores and results list the United Arab Emirates' goal tally first.

References

External links
 

1983 births
Living people
Emirati people of Baloch descent
Emirati footballers
Sportspeople from Dubai
Association football utility players
Al Shabab Al Arabi Club Dubai players
Al Ain FC players
Shabab Al-Ahli Club players
Al-Ittihad Kalba SC players
Hatta Club players
UAE Pro League players
UAE First Division League players
Association football fullbacks
Association football wingers
United Arab Emirates international footballers